1.000 may represent either:
the number 1000 (the point being a thousands separator, as common in many European countries)
the number 1 known to four significant figures, i.e. 1±0.0005 (here the dot is a decimal separator, as commonly used in much of the English-speaking world)

See also 
 1000 (disambiguation)